Ron Beattie (born 21 September 1953) is a former Australian rules footballer who played with Hawthorn in the Victorian Football League (VFL).

Beattie, a defender, made nine appearances for Hawthorn, in the second half of the 1974 VFL season.

He captained Coburg to a premiership in 1979, 51 years after their previous first-division flag.

References

External links
 
 

1953 births
Australian rules footballers from Victoria (Australia)
Hawthorn Football Club players
Coburg Football Club players
Living people